Al-Thawrah, also known as Al-Tabqah (also ), is a city in Raqqa Governorate, Syria, approximately  west of Raqqa. The name "al-Thawrah" literally means "The Revolution", in reference to the Baathist March 8th revolution in 1963. The Tabqa Dam and Lake Assad on the Euphrates, an important energy source for Syria, are near al-Thawrah. The city had a population of 69,425 as of the 2004 census. It is part of the Tabqa Region of the Autonomous Administration of North and East Syria.

Syrian Civil War 

On 26 November 2012, during the Syrian Civil War, a main route from Raqqa to Aleppo passing through al-Thawrah along the Euphrates was dotted with both government and Syrian rebel checkpoints. On 11 February 2013, rebel groups including the al-Nusra Front and Liwa Owais al-Qorani took over the city. On 21 November, there was fierce fighting between government troops and rebels in the town, but by 25 November, the rebels were back in control. The Islamic State of Iraq and the Levant took control in January 2014.

On 22 March 2017, SOHR reported that an international coalition airstrike killed or injured more than 40 people. The BBC reported 27 killed and 40 wounded. During ISIL rule, the town's Catholic, Antiochian Orthodox Church and Assyrian Church of the East churches were turned into a parking garage, a weapons factory and a barn, with ISIL militants destroying all Christian symbols on the three churches. The Shia Omar Bin al-Khatab Mosque was destroyed and an Ismaili place of worship was turned into a children's training centre. During IS rule, high ranking IS members would reside in the city, escaping the bombardments on its capital Raqqa. The Syrian Democratic Forces captured the town in the 2017 Battle of Tabqa during which an estimated 40% of the buildings were either damaged or destroyed.

Demographics 
Prior to the Civil War, the majority of the city's inhabitants were Sunni Arabs, with Kurdish, Armenian, Assyrian as well as Ismaili and Shiite Arab minorities. The Assyrian minority consisted of around 1,000 people, with about half belonging to the Assyrian Church of the East, originating from the Khabour River villages, and the other half being Syriac Orthodox Christians, along with a few Chaldean Catholic, Syriac Catholic and Protestant families. But now the Christians have left and very few returned after liberation.

Climate

See also 
 Battle of al-Tabqa Airbase
 Battle of Tabqa (2017)
 Al-Tabqa Dam raid (2017)

Notes 

Cities in Syria
Populated places in al-Thawrah District
Populated places on the Euphrates River